National Monuments Record (NMR) may refer to one or more of the following:
the former National Monuments Record (England): then English Heritage Archive (EHA), now Historic England Archive (HEA)
National Monuments Record of Scotland (NMRS)
National Monuments Record of Wales (NMRW)

See also
List of national archives
National monument
Sites and Monuments Record
Site of Special Scientific Interest (SSSI)